The Green Bay Phoenix men's basketball team is an NCAA Division I college basketball team competing in the Horizon League for the University of Wisconsin–Green Bay. The head coach for the Green Bay Phoenix is Sundance Wicks.

History
The Green Bay men's basketball teams' began in the 1969–70 school year where they competed at the NAIA level before it moved to NCAA Division 2 in 1973.  In 1982, it moved to NCAA Division 1 where it competed in the Association of Mid-Continent Universities (now the Summit League). Since 1994, Green Bay has been competing in the Horizon League (formerly the Midwestern Collegiate Conference). The Phoenix saw success in the early to mid 1990s, making their first NCAA appearance in 1991 and their first second round appearance in 1994. In recent years, the team made another first round appearance in 2016.

Division I seasons

Postseason

NCAA Division I Tournament results
The Phoenix have appeared in the NCAA Division I Tournament five times. Their combined record is 1–5.  Their highest seed was #8 in 1996.

NCAA Division II Tournament results
The Phoenix have appeared in the NCAA Division II Tournament six times. Their combined record is 13–8.

NAIA Tournament results
The Phoenix have appeared in the NAIA Tournament one time. Their record is 2–1.

NIT results
The Phoenix have appeared in the National Invitation Tournament (NIT) four times. Their combined record is 1–4.

CBI results
The Phoenix have appeared in the College Basketball Invitational (CBI) three times. Their combined record is 1–3.

CIT results
The Phoenix have appeared in the CollegeInsider.com Postseason Tournament (CIT) two times. Their combined record is 4–2.

Horizon League awards

Player of the Year
Jeff Nordgaard (1996)
Keifer Sykes (2014, 2015)

Defensive Player of the Year
Terry Evans (2008)
Alec Brown (2014)

Sixth Man of the Year
Ryan Tillema (2009)
Warren Jones (2017)

Freshman of the Year
Amari Davis (2020)

Coach of the Year
Brian Wardle (2014)

All-League First Team

Javier Mendiburu (2005)
Ryan Tillema (2009)
Rahmon Fletcher (2010)
Alec Brown (2012, 2014)
Keifer Sykes (2013, 2014, 2015)
Carrington Love (2016)
Khalil Small (2018)
Sandy Cohen III (2019)
JayQuan McCloud (2020)

All-League Second Team
Brandon Morris (2004)
Benito Flores (2005)
Ryan Evanochko (2006, 2007)
Mike Schachtner (2007, 2008)
Rahmon Fletcher (2009, 2011)
Alec Brown (2013)
Greg Mays (2015)
Jordan Fouse (2016)
Charles Cooper (2017)

All-League Third Team
Amari Davis (2020)

All-Freshman Team/All-Newcomer Team
Brandon Morris (2004)
Benito Flores (2005)
Mike Schachtner (2006)
Rahmon Fletcher (2008)
Alec Brown (2011)
Keifer Sykes (2012)
Jordan Fouse (2013)
Amari Davis (2020)

All-Defensive Team
Terry Evans (2006, 2007, 2008, 2009)
Alec Brown (2013, 2014)
Jordan Fouse (2013, 2014, 2015, 2016)
Carrington Love (2016)
Kenneth Lowe (2017)
Khalil Small (2017, 2018)

References

External links